Big Wheel is the name of different supervillains appearing in American comic books published by Marvel Comics.

The first Big Wheel is Jackson Weele who rides around in a large metal wheel vehicle.

Publication history
The Jackson Weele version of Big Wheel first appeared in The Amazing Spider-Man #183 (July 1978) and was created by Marv Wolfman, Ross Andru, and Mike Esposito.

Fictional character biography

Jackson Weele
Jackson Weele is a businessman who has embezzled from his company. Fearing that he might be caught, he hires a youthful criminal named Rocket Racer to steal the evidence that incriminates him. However, Rocket Racer opts to use the evidence to blackmail Weele instead. Despairing, Weele tries to commit suicide, but Rocket Racer prevents him from doing so. However, Racer is not particularly kind to Weele, disparagingly referring to him as "Big Weele". Humiliated by Rocket Racer's taunts, Weele visits the mechanical genius and underworld supplier Tinkerer, who the Rocket Racer boasted had upgraded his equipment. At Weele's urging, the Tinkerer creates a large metal wheel that can climb up buildings, complete with guns and waldo-arms.

With this new vehicle, Weele becomes the supervillain known as "Big Wheel". Newly empowered, Big Wheel hunts down and chases Rocket Racer across the city. In the process, he ends up fighting the title character, Spider-Man. Spider-Man is also seeking Rocket Racer, whom he had battled in a previous issue. Unfortunately, Weele lacks practice in using his new device and, in the heat of battle, the Big Wheel topples off a high rooftop and plunges into the Hudson River. Spider-Man tries to save him, but comes up empty-handed. He presumes Jackson Weele died when the Big Wheel vehicle sank to the bottom of the river.

Big Wheel did not appear in another comic book for more than twenty years. However, the story was picked up again by writer Cristos Gage. Weele survives his seemingly deadly encounter, turning up again with his Big Wheel vehicle while Spider-Man is in combat with Stilt-Man. This time, Big Wheel attempts to help Spider-Man. However, due to his interference, Stilt-Man escapes. Confronted by Spider-Man, Weele reveals that, in the interim since their last meeting, he went to jail for embezzlement and joined Vil-Anon, an analog of Alcoholics Anonymous for super-villains. In fact, his attempt to help the hero was part of his twelve-step program. Out of pity, Spider-Man lets Big Wheel accompany him for the rest of the day. While foiling a bank robbery, the pair confronts the Shocker. Although they defeat him, Jackson Weele finally realizes that he is not cut out for super-heroics. He now makes his living using his Big Wheel rig in demolition derbies and speaking at events for Vil-Anon.

The Big Wheel is discussed in The Spectacular Spider-Man #21 (Jan. 2005) during a super-hero poker game. Spider-Man tells Reed Richards that the Big Wheel is one of the craziest things he has ever seen (along with a gang of mimes). The Human Torch says he has met the man at the 'Rusty Nail' and he is working as a security guard. The Torch also claims the Wheel's first name is Axel, although he may be joking.

During the Civil War storyline, Big Wheel is shown being chased by the Harbor Patrol, implying that he returned to super-heroics despite the doubts he harbored in Spider-Man Unlimited.

Later, he is brought in by Spider-Man and Iron Man concerning black market connections that Iron Man believes may have aided Ezekiel Stane.

Jackson later returns in a more jagged version of his Big Wheel machine and joins Blackout and other villains in a mission to kill Ghost Rider.

As part of "Marvel NOW!", Big Wheel's original vehicle later resurfaces in possession of Overdrive, who upgrades it with his technological powers and uses it as a personal vehicle during his tenure in the Sinister Six. The Superior Spider-Man (Doctor Octopus' mind in Peter Parker's body) is later able to reverse the changes, restoring the Big Wheel to its intended appearance and power.

Big Wheel is later forced into committing crimes (such as stealing a prized pair of alpacas) for Lady Caterpillar who had abducted his girlfriend Rebecca Townley.

Second Big Wheel
An unnamed operator of the Big Wheel was on a crime spree until he was defeated by Spider-Man.

Powers and abilities
Jackson Weele has no superpowers, and instead derives his strength by driving a large, metal wheel which is equipped with guns and waldo-arms.

Reception
 In 2022, CBR.com ranked Big Wheel 8th in their "Spider-Man's 10 Funniest Villains" list.

In other media

Television
 The Jackson Weele incarnation of Big Wheel appears in the Spider-Man: The Animated Series episode "Rocket Racer", voiced by Michael Des Barres. This version is an aeronautics expert who leads a gang of high-tech thieves and achieved everything from proper timing and planning. After Rocket Racer steals technology from him, Weele seeks revenge, only to be defeated by the vigilante and Spider-Man.

Video games
 Big Wheel is referenced as a collectable item simply called "Wheel Miniature" in the game Spider-Man: Miles Morales.
 Big Wheel appears in Spider-Man: Mysterio's Menace.
 Big Wheel appears as an assist character in the PSP version of Spider-Man: Web of Shadows.
 A Marvel 2099 incarnation of Big Wheel appears in the Nintendo DS version of Spider-Man: Edge of Time, voiced by Steve Blum.

References

External links
 
 Big Wheel at Marvel Directory
 Profile at Spiderfan.org

Comics characters introduced in 1978
Characters created by Marv Wolfman
Fictional characters from New York City
Marvel Comics male supervillains
Marvel Comics supervillains
Characters created by Ross Andru
Fictional businesspeople
Spider-Man characters